SS Gainsborough was a passenger and cargo vessel built for the Manchester, Sheffield and Lincolnshire Railway in 1880.

History

Gainsborough was built by Earle's Shipbuilding of Hull, England, and launched on 20 December 1880 christened by Mrs. Bristow, wife of Captain Bristow of the New York liner Romano.  She had a large poop fitted with a large saloon and state rooms for 40 first-class passengers, top-gallant forecastle for seamen and firemen, and accommodation for emigrants between decks. She was put on the route between Grimsby, England, and Hamburg, Germany.

On 27 December 1883, having been delayed by fog, she left the mouth of the River Elbe, and when in the North Sea about 25 miles from Spurn Point, Yorkshire, England, was struck amidships by the steam collier Wear, on a voyage from Sunderland to London. Gainsborough was cut down to below the waterline and sank in a few minutes. The passengers and crew of Gainsborough were taken off by Wear, but it was feared that Wear was also sinking so they were transferred to Franklin and taken to London.

References

1880 ships
Ships built on the Humber
Steamships of the United Kingdom
Paddle steamers of the United Kingdom
Ships of the Manchester, Sheffield and Lincolnshire Railway
Maritime incidents in December 1883
Ships sunk in collisions
Ships sunk with no fatalities
Shipwrecks in the North Sea